Orlando Etcheverre Garay (born 1933) is a Chilean basketball player. He competed in the men's tournament at the 1956 Summer Olympics.

References

External links

1933 births
Living people
Chilean men's basketball players
1959 FIBA World Championship players
Olympic basketball players of Chile
Basketball players at the 1956 Summer Olympics
Place of birth missing (living people)